Katie Volynets was the defending champion but retired in the semifinals against Gabriela Lee.

Lee went on to win the title, defeating Katarzyna Kawa in the final, 6–1, 6–3.

Seeds

Draw

Finals

Top half

Bottom half

References

Main Draw

FineMark Women's Pro Tennis Championship - Singles